Veritas Christian Academy is a private, Christian school in Fletcher, North Carolina. All grades Pre-K to 12th grade are included on one main campus.

In 2018 the school had 320 students and 33.4 teachers on a full-time-equivalents (FTE) basis; a teacher-student ratio of 9.6. Of these, 290 or 90.6% were white.

References

Christian schools in North Carolina
Classical Christian schools
Nondenominational Christian schools in the United States
Private high schools in North Carolina
Private middle schools in North Carolina
Private elementary schools in North Carolina
Schools in Henderson County, North Carolina